is a 1979 Japanese television series. It is the 17th NHK taiga drama.

Story
Kusa Moeru deals with the Kamakura period. Based on Michiko Nagai's novels "Hojo Masako" and "Enkan".

The story chronicles the life of Hōjō Masako.

Cast

Minamoto no Yoritomo's family
Kōji Ishizaka as Minamoto no Yoritomo, the first shōgun of the Kamakura shogunate
Yōji Matsuda as young Yoritomo
Shima Iwashita as Hōjō Masako 
Tomiyuki Kunihiro as Minamoto no Yoshitsune
Hiromi Go as Minamoto no Yoriie, the second shōgun
Shingo Tsurumi as young Yoriie
Saburō Shinoda as Minamoto no Sanetomo, the third shōgun
Taiki Matsuno as young Sanetomo
 Kimiko Ikegami as Ōhime

Minamoto no Yoritomo's vassels
Shinjirō Ehara as Kajiwara Kagetoki
Tetsuya Takeda as Adachi Morinaga
Shōhei Hino as Adachi Kagemori
Kei Sato as Hiki Yoshikazu
Hiroshi Fujioka as Miura Yoshimura
Toshio Shiba as Miura Taneyoshi
Masaki Kyomoto as Komawaka-maru (later known as Miura Mitsumura)
Shin Kishida as Ōe no Hiromoto
Kohji Moritsugu as Hatakeyama Shigetada
Goro Ibuki as Wada Yoshimori
Jouji Nakata as Nitta Tadatsune
Hōsei Komatsu as Kazusa-no-suke Hirotsune

Hōjō clan
Ryunosuke Kaneda as Hōjō Tokimasa
Naoko Otani as Maki no Kata
Ken Matsudaira as Hojo Yoshitoki
Jin Nakayama as Hōjō Munetoki
Junpei Morita as Hōjō Tokifusa
Hisayuki Nakajima as Hōjō Yasutoki
Toshinori Omi as young Yasutoki
Ryoko Sakaguchi as Nohagi, a.k.a. Hime no Mae, Yoshitoki's second wife
Keiko Matsuzaka as Akane (fictional person), Yoshitoki's first wife

Taira clan
Nobuo Kaneko as Taira no Kiyomori
Kaneko Iwasaki as Taira no Tokiko, Kiyomori's wife
Ken Nishida as Taira no Munemori
Etsuko Ikuta as Taira no Tokuko

Others
 Sakae Takita as Ito Sukeyuki
 Akira Kume as Ito Sukechika
 Isao Hashizume as Ito Sukekiyo
 Takeshi Kato as Ōba Kagechika
 Kyōzō Nagatsuka as Yamaki Kanetaka
 Keiko Matsuzaka as Kogiku
 Yumi Takigawa as Otowa
 Rokko Toura as Minamoto no Yukiie
 Shigeo Ozawa as Ashikaga Yoshiuji, Hōjō Yasutoki's son-in-law
 Rino Katase
 Yasuyoshi Hara as Soga Tokimune
 Toshio Kurosawa as Kokemaru
 Akihiro Miwa
 Akihiko Hirata as Ichijō Yoshiyasu
 Junko Natsu as Kyo no Tsubone
 Kōjirō Kusanagi as Chinnakei
 Mitsuko Kusabue as Tango no Tsubone
 Onoe Shoroku II as Go-Shirakawa
 Onoe Tatsunosuke I as Emperor Go-Toba

TV schedule

References

External links
Taiga drama Kusa Moeru NHK

1979 Japanese television series debuts
1979 Japanese television series endings
Taiga drama
1970s drama television series
Cultural depictions of Hōjō Masako
Cultural depictions of Minamoto no Yoshitsune
Jidaigeki television series
Television series set in the 12th century
Television series set in the 13th century